Avital Abergel (born June 10, 1977) is an Israeli film and TV actress.
Abergel has appeared in such (Israeli) films as "Aaron Cohen's Debt" and "Something Sweet". Likewise, Abergel is also a successful TV actress appearing in a number of Israeli Television series, such as: "The Good Guys", "The Other Woman", "Intensive care unit" and "Deep Blue".

Abergel is primarily known for acting as the character "Elinor Malchi" in the Children's TV Series "Octave" which is televised on the Children's Channel (Israel).

In 2005, she appeared in the Teen movie: "You Are (betrothed to me)" with the director of the Israeli film "Piza'at Lichtman"

External links
Avital Abergel Official Myspace

1977 births
Living people
Israeli people of Moroccan-Jewish descent
Jewish Israeli actresses
Israeli film actresses
20th-century Israeli actresses
21st-century Israeli actresses
People from Ramat Gan
20th-century Israeli Jews
21st-century Israeli Jews